Events in the year 1204 in Norway.

Incumbents
Monarch: Haakon III Sverresson then Guttorm Sigurdsson then Inge II Bårdsson

Events

Arts and literature

Births
Haakon IV of Norway, king (died 1263).

Deaths
1 January – Haakon III of Norway, king (assumed born 1170s).
11 August – Guttorm of Norway, king (child ruler) (born c. 1200).

References

Norway